was built by Showa Women's University in Tokyo, Japan on its campus in 1980 to celebrate the 60th anniversary of the foundation of its predecessor, the Japan Women's School of Higher Education.  It is a concert venue.

Notes 

Buildings and structures completed in 1980
Concert halls in Japan
Music venues completed in 1980
Music venues in Tokyo
Showa Women's University
1980 establishments in Japan